WGSS (89.3 FM) is a non-commercial educational radio station licensed to Copiague, New York. It broadcasts a Christian radio format and is owned by Calvary Chapel of Hope.

History 
In October 2007, Calvary Chapel of Hope applied to the Federal Communications Commission (FCC) for a construction permit for a new non-commercial FM radio station. The FCC granted the permit on April 20, 2009, with a scheduled expiration of April 20, 2012. The station was assigned the WGSS call sign by the FCC on May 12, 2009. WGSS began broadcasting in early April 2012 and received its broadcast license on April 24, 2012.

References

External links 
 

GSS (FM)
Radio stations established in 2012
Mass media in Suffolk County, New York